This is a list of lakes fully or partially within the borders of the Democratic Republic of the Congo.

 Lake albar
 Lake Albert (Lake Mobutu Sese Seko)
 Lake Ambale
 Lake Balukila
 Lake Batuli
 Lake Benaît
 Lake Bita
 Lake Boya
 Lake Delcommune (Lake Nzilo)
 Lake Dikolongo
 Lake Édouard (Lake Idi Amin)
 Lake Fwa
 Lake Gongalo
 Lake Kabamba
 Lake Kabele
 Lake Kabumba
 Lake Kabwe
 Lake Kalenga
 Lake Kalombwe
 Lake Kalumbe
 Lake Kana
 Lake Kapandwe
 Lake Kapondwe
 Lake Kapumbwe
 Lake Kasuku
 Lake Kayumba
 Lake Kazibaziba
 Lake Kibala
 Lake Kibunga
 Lake Kifukulu
 Lake Kilombwe
 Lake Kilumbe
 Lake Kinda
 Lake Kirwa
 Lake Kisale
 Lake Kishiba-Pande
 Lake Kitombole
 Lake Kitoponti
 Lake Kitulu
 Lake Kiubo
 Lake Kivu
 Lake Kuibo
 Lake Kwada
 Lake Libanda
 Lake Lukanga
 Lake Lukulu
 Lake Lunda
 Lake Lungwe
 Lake Lutembale
 Lake Mai-Ndombe (Lake Léopold II)
 Lake Makamba
 Lake Makambe
 Lake Mankamba
 Lake Mayumbwe
 Lake Molanda
 Lake Mugumba
 Lake Mukushi
 Lake Mulenda
 Lake Munkamba (Lake Mukamba)
 Lake Musala
 Lake Muyumbwe
 Lake Mwaba
 Lake Mwero
 Lake Mwipotondo
 Lake Nanu
 Lake Ndalaga
 Lake Niange
 Lake Nyangwe
 Lake Nyeba
 Lake Ondo
 Lake Paku
 Lake Showa
 Lake Tambe
 Lake Tanganyika
 Lake Tshangalele (Lake de Retenue de la Lufira)
 Lake Tukanga
 Lake Tukenga
 Lake Tumba
 Lake Tungwe
 Lake Upemba
 Lake Vundu
 Lake Zibanza
 Lake Ziba-Ziba
 Lake Zimbambo

References

Congo, Democratic Republic Of The